This is a list of events from British radio in 1931.

Events
10 January–4 April – Behind the Screen, a serial written by members of the Detection Club, is broadcast on the BBC National Programme.
17 May – Moorside Edge transmitting station in west Yorkshire begins broadcasting the BBC North Regional Programme on 626 kHz and, from 12 July, the BBC National Programme on 995 kHz.
8 September – W. B. Yeats makes his first BBC talk, an introduction to his version of King Oedipus broadcast from its Belfast studio.
13 September – Westerglen transmitting station begins broadcasting the BBC Regional Programme for Scotland.
Autumn – The BBC subsumes all its adult education radio broadcasts under the title The Changing World transmitted in the early evening and lasting around 25 minutes each; presenters will include T. S. Eliot, Harold Nicolson, Julian Huxley and William Beveridge who also author accompanying pamphlets.

Births
February – Patricia Greene, actress
2 February – Les Dawson, comedian (died 1993)
18 February – Ned Sherrin, broadcaster and entertainer (died 2007)
9 December – Ian McIntyre, Scottish journalist and BBC Radio executive (died 2014)
Edward Taylor, scriptwriter

References 

 
Years in British radio
Radio